Limestone Township is a civil township of Alger County in the U.S. state of Michigan.  The population was 438 at the 2010 census.

Communities
There are no incorporated municipalities in the township. There are some historic locales and unincorporated communities:
It was at the junction between two former railroad lines. The name was supposedly chosen for its brevity.
It is a former sawmill settlement on the Chicago and North Western Transportation Company. The community was named after Lake Ladoga, in Russia.
It was first settled in 1889. A post office was established on October 12, 1892, with John H. Johnson as the first postmaster. It was named for the limestone bed of Johnson Creek which flows through the area. The post office was discontinued on July 15, 1984.
The Huber family were the first white settlers in the area in 1880, which was then known as Whitefish, due to its location on the Whitefish River, and later as West Limestone from its location in Limestone Township. A post office was established on December 11, 1915, named Kiva, after a shortened form of the name of the first postmaster, Sigrid Kivimaki. The office was discontinued on August 11, 1967.
George Nickel homesteaded  of land here in about 1895. The community began to grow rapidly in about 1910 with an influx of Slovene immigrants to work in area lumber camps. The place was first known as "Buckeye Landing" and "Buckeye Spur", after the Buckeye Land & Lumber Company. Storekeeper Louis Mikulich (Mikulič) became the first postmaster in July 1927 and renamed the town after the native Slovene village of many of the settlers, Travnik (not to be confused with the Bosnian city of Travnik).

Geography

Demographics

As of the census of 2000, there were 407 people, 174 households, and 124 families residing in the township.  The population density was 5.5 per square mile (2.1/km2).  There were 333 housing units at an average density of 4.5 per square mile (1.7/km2).  The racial makeup of the township was 94.84% White, 1.47% African American, 1.47% Native American, 0.98% from other races, and 1.23% from two or more races. Hispanic or Latino of any race were 1.72% of the population. 17.0% were of United States or American, 13.6% Finnish, 12.9% German, 10.6% Polish, 9.1% French and 6.1% English ancestry according to Census 2000.

There were 174 households, out of which 25.3% had children under the age of 18 living with them, 63.8% were married couples living together, 5.2% had a female householder with no husband present, and 28.2% were non-families. 24.1% of all households were made up of individuals, and 8.6% had someone living alone who was 65 years of age or older.  The average household size was 2.34 and the average family size was 2.77.

In the township the population was spread out, with 21.4% under the age of 18, 3.7% from 18 to 24, 24.3% from 25 to 44, 34.9% from 45 to 64, and 15.7% who were 65 years of age or older.  The median age was 46 years. For every 100 females, there were 89.3 males.  For every 100 females age 18 and over, there were 97.5 males.

The median income for a household in the township was $35,938, and the median income for a family was $37,981. Males had a median income of $36,094 versus $21,750 for females. The per capita income for the township was $15,384.  About 7.8% of families and 9.0% of the population were below the poverty line, including 15.6% of those under age 18 and none of those age 65 or over.

References

Townships in Alger County, Michigan
Townships in Michigan